Prudy Taylor Board (born 21 December 1933), who also writes under the name Prue Foster, is an American author and editor. She was born in Florida.

Board has written more than 1,000 magazine and newspaper articles, and has also written several novels and nonfiction books.

Her books include a history of the Vinoy Park Hotel.

References

External links
 The Imprudent Author: Prudy Taylor Board
 Interview with Prudy Taylor Board

1933 births
Living people
American travel writers
American women travel writers
Novelists from Florida
American women novelists
20th-century American novelists
20th-century American women writers
20th-century American non-fiction writers
21st-century American women